Group A of the 2001 Fed Cup World Group was one of two pools in the World Group of the 2001 Fed Cup. Four teams competed in a round robin competition, with the top team advancing to the final.

Russia vs. Czech Republic

Russia vs. Argentina

France vs. Czech Republic

Russia vs. France

Argentina vs. Czech Republic

France vs. Argentina

See also
Fed Cup structure

References

External links
 Fed Cup website

2001 Fed Cup World Group